Doringbaai is a settlement in West Coast District Municipality in the Western Cape province of South Africa.

Doringbaai, previously known as Doornbaai, is a small fishing village. The main economic activity is the packaging and export of crayfish. In the past, the bay at Doringbaai was used as an anchorage for the trade route; provisions were deposited here and transported to Vanrhynsdorp by camel. The lighthouse, one of the local landmarks, was built in 1963.

References

Populated places in the Matzikama Local Municipality